The 2002 Army Black Knights football team was an American football team that represented the United States Military Academy as a member of Conference USA (C-USA) in the 2002 NCAA Division I-A football season. In their third season under head coach Todd Berry, the Black Knights compiled a 1–11 record and were outscored by their opponents by a combined total of 491 to 226.  In the annual Army–Navy Game, the Black Knights lost to Navy, 58–12. This loss began a 14-game losing streak by Army against Navy.

Schedule

Roster

References

Army
Army Black Knights football seasons
Army Black Knights football